Mohammad Al-Ali (July 17, 1949 - January 3, 2002) was a Saudi actor. He was known for his roles in comedy and tragedy.

Career 
He started his acting career in 1965 in Play called "Al-Mozifon", his Career ended in 2001 in series called "Tam Al-Ayam on Saudi TV .

Life 
Al-Ali was born Abdullah bin Ali Al Salem in Riyadh on July 17, 1949. He first studied in Saudi Arabia then moved to Damascus and Cairo. He returned to Riyadh in 1962-1965 where he joined the Saudi television before studying Electronic Engineering in the United Kingdom for four years until 1970. In the same years he worked as English announcer in Saudi Arabian Airlines. Al-Ali married and had three boys, and 3 girls.

Al-Ali died from a  heart attack on January 3, 2002.

Some acting works

Series
 Gadan tasraq Al- Samas
 hikyah mathal
 Ayam la tunsa in 1974
 Awdat Aswayd 1985

Plays
 Al-Mozifon
 Tahat Al-Karsi with  Rashid Al Shamrani, Nasir Al-Gasabi, Abdullah Al-Sadhan

References 

1949 births
2002 deaths
Respiratory disease deaths in Saudi Arabia
Saudi Arabian male stage actors
Saudi Arabian male television actors
People from Riyadh